Zejnullahu is a surname. Notable people with the surname include:

Eroll Zejnullahu (born 1994), Kosovo Albanian footballer
Jusuf Zejnullahu (born 1944), Kosovar politician